is a town located in Yamanashi Prefecture, Japan. , the town had an estimated population of 11,674 in 5447 households, and a population density of 39 persons per km2.

Geography
Minobu is in south-central Yamanashi Prefecture. The Fuji River passes through the town, which is dominated by the sacred Mount Minobu. It also shares Lake Motosu with neighbouring Fujikawaguchiko.

Neighboring municipalities
Yamanashi Prefecture
Kōfu
Nanbu
Ichikawamisato
Hayakawa
Fujikawa
Fujikawaguchiko
Shizuoka Prefecture
Aoi-ku, Shizuoka
Fujinomiya

Climate
The town has a climate characterized by hot and humid summers, and relatively mild winters (Köppen climate classification Cfa).  The average annual temperature in Minobu is 14.1 °C. The average annual rainfall is 1540 mm with September as the wettest month. The temperatures are highest on average in August, at around 26.0 °C, and lowest in January, at around 2.6 °C.

Demographics
Per Japanese census data, the population of Minobu has declined substantially over the past 70 years.

History
Minobu developed from the Kamakura period as a temple town outside the gates of the important Buddhist temple of Kuon-ji, one of the primary head temples of the Nichiren Shū.

During the reform of the early Meiji period on April 1, 1889, Minamikoma District within Yamanashi Prefecture was created and organized into 22 villages. Minobu village was raised to town status on January 1, 1931. On February 11, 1955 the town expanded by annexing three neighboring villages. On September 13, 2004, Minobu absorbed the towns of Nakatomi, also from Minamikoma District, and Shimobe, from Nishiyatsushiro District.

Education
Minobusan University
 Minobu has three public elementary schools and one public junior high school operated by the town government. The town has two public high schools operated by the Yamanashi Prefectural Board of Education and one private high school.

Transportation

Railway
 Central Japan Railway Company -  Minobu Line
 -  -   -  -  -  -  -

Highway

Local attractions
Kuon-ji – Buddhist temple which is the supreme head temple of Nichiren sect
Nakayama Kinzan, ruins of a Sengoku period gold mine and National Historic Site

References

External links

Official website 

 
Towns in Yamanashi Prefecture